Patrick Allen Lowe FREng (born 8 April 1962), known as Paddy Lowe, is the founder and CEO of the fossil-free synthetic fuel company Zero. A former motor racing engineer and computer scientist, he spent 32 years working in Formula One, serving as Chief Technical Officer at Williams Racing, Executive Director (Technical) at Mercedes Formula One team and Technical Director at McLaren. He was involved with cars that won 12 World Championships (7 Drivers', 5 Constructors') and secured 158 race wins. He left Formula One in 2019 and co-founded Zero in 2020.

Education
Lowe attended Sevenoaks School from 1976 until 1980 and graduated from Sidney Sussex College, University of Cambridge in 1984 with a degree in Engineering.

Formula One career
Lowe worked in Formula One over four decades. He was involved in cars that won 12 World Championships (7 Drivers and 5 Constructors) and 10 Autosport Racing Car of the Year awards, pioneering innovative systems including active suspension, traction control and driving simulators. He was the Technical Director behind the first 53 wins of Lewis Hamilton's record-breaking career and he led the Mercedes team to the most successful F1 season ever recorded, with 19 wins from 21 races in 2016.

Williams (1987–1993)
In 1987 Lowe was employed by Williams as Joint Head of Electronics. He spent six years at Williams, during which time he oversaw the development of active suspension, used to help Nigel Mansell win the 1992 World Championship.

McLaren (1993–2013)
Lowe moved to McLaren in 1993, when he was employed as Head of Research and Development, a department subsequently renamed Vehicle Technology. He was head of the department for eight years until 2001, when he was appointed Chief Engineer Systems Development, a role focusing on the race programme for the McLaren MP4-20. In May 2005 he assumed the role of Engineering Director, which gave him responsibility for all the engineering departments. In January 2011 Lowe became the team's Technical Director. He left McLaren in 2013.

Mercedes (2013–2017)

Lowe moved to the Mercedes Formula One team as Executive Director on 3 June 2013.

In 2015 Lowe was elected a Fellow of the Royal Academy of Engineering. He and his elder brother Professor Michael Lowe were the first brothers to both be elected as a Fellow of the Royal Academy of Engineering.

On 10 January 2017, Mercedes announced that Lowe had left the team, and entered a period of garden leave.

Return to Williams (2017–2019)
Lowe returned to Williams as Chief Technical Officer on 16 March 2017. He replaced Pat Symonds, who left the team at the end of 2016. Alongside his technical position, Lowe became a shareholder in the team. The Williams cars under his supervision, FW41 and FW42, turned out to be largely uncompetitive and relegated Williams to the bottom of the Constructors' Championship in 2018 and 2019. On 6 March 2019 it was announced that Lowe would be taking a leave of absence due to personal reasons. On 25 June 2019, Lowe left Williams with immediate effect.

Formula One World Championships

Drivers' World Championships
1992: Nigel Mansell, Williams FW14B
1998: Mika Häkkinen, McLaren MP4/13
1999: Mika Häkkinen, McLaren MP4/14
2008: Lewis Hamilton, McLaren MP4/23
2014: Lewis Hamilton, Mercedes F1 W05 Hybrid
2015: Lewis Hamilton, Mercedes F1 W06 Hybrid
2016: Nico Rosberg, Mercedes F1 W07 Hybrid
Constructors' World Championships

 1992: Williams FW14B
 1998: McLaren MP4/13
 2014: Mercedes F1 W05 Hybrid
 2015: Mercedes F1 W06 Hybrid
 2016: Mercedes F1 W07 Hybrid

Zero Synthetic Fuels
Lowe is the co-founder of Zero, a British technology company that develops and manufactures whole-blend synthetic, non-biological, fossil-free fuels – petrol (gasoline), diesel and jet fuel. The process uses just carbon dioxide taken from the air and renewable hydrogen made from water. Lowe calls this process petrosynthesis. Synthetic fuels, which can be made at scale, can be dropped straight into the existing engines of cars, aircraft, commercial and agricultural vehicles, allowing them to run sustainably in exactly the same way and with the same performance as they do on fossil fuels, without the need for any engine modification. They eliminate greenhouse gas accumulation through the creation of a circular carbon cycle, and so eliminate the need for fossil fuels in global industries such as aviation.

Family
Lowe is married to screen actress, Anna Danshina. He has two children from a previous relationship: Noah Kelly and Finty Kelly.

His brother, Michael Lowe, is a British mechanical engineer.

Further reading

References

1962 births
Living people
People educated at Sevenoaks School
Alumni of Sidney Sussex College, Cambridge
English engineers
British automotive engineers
Formula One engineers
McLaren people
Fellows of the Royal Academy of Engineering
Williams Grand Prix Engineering